Caty may refer to:

People
 Caty Dehaene (born 1965), Belgian snooker player
 Caty Flagg (born 1998), American ice hockey player
 Caty Louette (1713-1776), African signara and businessperson
 Caty McNally (born 2001), American tennis player

Other
 CATY, holding company for Cathay Bank

See also
 Cati (disambiguation)
 Katy (disambiguation)